The Corvus Phantom is a Hungarian two-seat ultralight aircraft produced by Corvus Aircraft.

In the USA it is marketed as the Falcon LS, from 2008 until 2010 by T&T Aviation, since 2010 by Renegade Light Sport. In Germany the aircraft is called the Wild Angel and in the United Kingdom the Crusader.

Variants
Phantom UL
Production variant certified as an Ultralight.
Phantom RG
Variant with retractable landing gear.

Specifications (Phantom UL)

References

External links

 

2000s Hungarian civil utility aircraft
Phantom
Low-wing aircraft
Single-engined tractor aircraft
Aircraft first flown in 2006